Euplokamis dunlapae is a marine species of ctenophore. It is the first species of ctenophora reported to have giant axons controlling the comb rows. They control the ciliary beating, allowing for rapid change in the speed and direction of the cilia, likely evolved as an escape mechanism.

References 

Tentaculata
Fauna of the Atlantic Ocean
Fauna of the Pacific Ocean
Species described in 1987